Gai is a former municipality in the district of Leoben in the Austrian state of Styria. Since January 2013, it is part of the municipality Trofaiach.

Geography

References

Cities and towns in Leoben District